RTL Radio is a German commercial radio station based in Berlin and the part of the RTL Group. It originated as the German language service of Radio Luxembourg, which began broadcasting after World War II from Luxembourg. It broadcasts adult contemporary music nationally via cable, DAB+ satellite and internet and regionally via FM in Luxembourg, Rheinland-Pfalz, Saarland, eastern German-speaking Belgium, and Lorraine.

History

RTL Radio began broadcasting as the German service of Radio Luxembourg on 15 July 1957. Along with the Saarland-based pirate radio Europe 1, Luxembourg interfered with the non-commercial monopoly imposed by the German states since broadcasting first started in the country. Apart from advertising reaching German radios for the first time, RTL also introduced Germans from both East and West to rock-and-roll, bebop/cool jazz and other types of American popular music which contrasted to the classical repertoire that had dominated mainland services.

In 1990, Radio Luxembourg was renamed RTL Hörfunk. On 1 July 2015 RTL Radio branded itself RTL Radio – Deutschlands Hit-Radio and moved its studios from the City of Luxembourg to Berlin.

RTL Radio has slots on analog and digital cable, and transmits digital signals via the Astra 1L satellites.

External links 
 Homepage of RTL Radio (in German)
 Homepage of RTL Radio for Luxembourg  (in German)
 History of the German service of Radio Luxemburg (in German)

Radio stations in Luxembourg
International broadcasters
Mass media companies of Luxembourg
German-language radio stations
RTL Group
1933 establishments in Luxembourg
Radio stations established in 1933